Kepper or De Kepper is a surname. Notable people with the surname include: 

Anna Dean Kepper (1938–1983) American historian
Christophe De Kepper, Belgian lawyer and sports administrator
Troy Kepper (born 1982), American rower

See also
Hepper
Klepper